His Majesty's Hired armed cutter Brave served the British Royal Navy from 29 August 1798 until 22 April 1799, when the transport Eclipse ran her down off Beachy Head. Brave is sometimes described as a lugger and sometimes as a cutter.

During her brief service with the Royal Navy Brave′s captain was Lieutenant Gardiner Henry Guion (or John Guion or Guyon or Gunion). On 21 January 1799 Brave captured Jemmy Nosten. Then on 3 March Brave, together with the hired armed cutter Lord Nelson, captured Baron Von Hopkin and Sverige Lycka. 

On 22 April while Brave was escorting a convoy through the English Channel, the transport Eclipse ran her down and sank her. Brave's crew was saved.

On 13 September 1804 prize money for Baron Von Hopkin and Sverige Lycka was paid.

Notes, citations, and references
Notes

Citations

References

Clowes, W. Laird, et al. (1897-1903) The royal navy: a history from the earliest times to the present. (Boston: Little, Brown and Co.; London: S. Low, Marston and Co.).
 
 
  

Hired armed vessels of the Royal Navy
1790s ships
Maritime incidents in 1799
Ships sunk in collisions
Shipwrecks in the English Channel